Route 119 is a highway in Dent County.  Its northern terminus is at Route 32 southwest of Salem; its southern terminus is at Montauk State Park.  There are no towns on the highway.

Major intersections

References

119
Transportation in Dent County, Missouri